Laura Antoja Rovira (born 11 September 1977) is a former Spanish basketball player; her last team was CB Avenida in Spanish League and Euroleague. She was born in Barcelona, and is a 1.66 m guard.

Career
 1997-1999 Universitari Barcelona
 2000-2001 AE Centre Sanfeliu
 2001-2004 Sedis Bàsquet
 2004-2006 UB - FC Barcelona
 2006-2007 Txingudi SBE
 2007-2008 CD Covíbar
 2008-2009 CDB Zaragoza
 2009-2011 Uni Girona CB
 2011-2013 CB Avenida

Titles
 2011: Spanish Women's Basketball Supercup
 2011: FIBA Europe SuperCup Women
 2012: Copa de la Reina de baloncesto
 2012: Spanish Women's Basketball Supercup
 2013: Liga Femenina

References

Spanish women's basketball players
Living people
1977 births
Guards (basketball)